Bernt Lennart Zarnowiecki (born 26 May 1954) is a Swedish swimmer who won a bronze medal in the 4 × 200 m freestyle relay at the 1974 European Aquatics Championships. He also competed in the same event at the 1972 Summer Olympics, but the Swedish team was eliminated in the preliminaries.

Being Jewish, he competed at the 1973 Maccabiah Games in Israel, and won three gold medals, including in the men's 400 m freestyle and the 1,500 m freestyle.

His twin sister, Anita Zarnowiecki, also competed in freestyle swimming at the 1972 Summer Olympics and the ninth Maccabiah Games.

References

1954 births
Swimmers at the 1972 Summer Olympics
Swedish male freestyle swimmers
Olympic swimmers of Sweden
Jewish swimmers
Swedish Jews
Living people
European Aquatics Championships medalists in swimming
Maccabiah Games gold medalists for Sweden
Maccabiah Games medalists in swimming
Competitors at the 1973 Maccabiah Games
Swimmers from Gothenburg